Leuven railway station, officially Leuven, is the main railway station in Leuven, Flemish Brabant, Belgium. The station is operated by the National Railway Company of Belgium (NMBS/SNCB) and is located on railway line 36. In 2007, it was the fifth-busiest station in Belgium, only preceded by the three main Brussels stations and Gent-Sint-Pieters railway station.

The station recently underwent extensive and costly renovations lasting several years. The station square houses a major bus terminal as well as extensive bicycle parking and car parking. The station includes a tunnel which passes underneath the station for pedestrians as well as an overhead bridge with elevators. The station is fully accessible for wheelchairs.

While a high-speed line passes through the station, Leuven is not a stop on any high-speed route. Current expansion is limited because the station has reached the maximum set of rail and platforms possible, meaning any further expansion would require building an underground segment.

Train services
The station is served by the following services:

Intercity services (IC-01) Ostend - Bruges - Ghent - Brussels - Leuven - Liege - Welkenraedt - Eupen
Intercity services (IC-03) Knokke/Blankenberge - Bruges - Ghent - Brussels - Leuven - Hasselt - Genk
Intercity services (IC-08) Antwerp - Mechelen - Brussels Airport - Leuven - Hasselt
Intercity services (IC-09) Antwerp - Lier - Aarschot - Leuven (weekdays)
Intercity services (IC-12) Kortrijk - Ghent - Brussels - Leuven - Liege - Welkenraedt (weekdays)
Intercity services (IC-14) Quiévrain - Mons - Braine-le-Comte - Brussels - Leuven - Liege (weekdays)
Intercity services (IC-21) Ghent - Dendermonde - Mechelen - Leuven (weekdays)
Intercity services (IC-29) De Panne - Ghent - Aalst - Brussels - Brussels Airport - Leuven - Landen
Local services (L-03) Leuven - Aarschot - Diest - Hasselt (weekends)
Local services (L-20) Sint-Niklaas – Mechelen – Leuven (weekdays)
Local services (L-20) Mechelen - Leuven (weekends)
Local services (L-23) Antwerp - Lier - Aarschot - Leuven
Brussels RER services (S2) Braine-le-Comte - Halle - Brussels - Leuven
Brussels RER services (S9) Braine-l'Alleud - Etterbeek - Brussels-Luxembourg - Leuven (weekdays, peak hours only)Brussels RER services (S20) Leuven - Wavre - Ottignies''

Accidents and incidents

On 18 February 2017, a passenger train was derailed near Leuven. One person was killed and 27 were injured.

See also
 List of railway stations in Belgium

References

External links
 Belgian Railways website for Leuven

Railway stations in Belgium
Railway stations in Flemish Brabant
Buildings and structures in Leuven